Jera is a genus of skippers in the family Hesperiidae. It is monotypic, being represented by the single species Jera tricuspidata.

References
Natural History Museum Lepidoptera genus database

Carcharodini
Hesperiidae genera